NITA may refer to:

Places 

Nita District, Shimane, Japan
Nita, Shimane, a former town merged with Yokota in 2005 to form Okuizumo

People 

Nita (given name)
Niță, a Romanian surname

NITA 

National Information Technology Agency, a public service institution of the Republic of Gabon
National Institute of Technology Agartala, a technology-oriented institute of higher education in Agartala, India
National Institute for Trial Advocacy, a nonprofit organization with headquarters in Boulder, Colorado
Nevada Interpreters and Translators Association, affiliated with the American Translators Association

Other uses 

Nita (spider), a genus in the spider family Pholcidae
USS Nita (1856), a captured Confederate steamer used by the Union Navy during the American Civil War
"N.I.T.A.", a song by Young Marble Giants from their album Colossal Youth